Cecilia Charlotte Asper Mettler (October 26, 1909 – December 1, 1943) was a medical historian. She was one of the first full-time, and the first female, professors of the history of medicine in the United States.

Biography
Mettler was born on October 26, 1909 in Weehawken, New Jersey. Her father, William Charles Asper, was a lawyer. She learned Latin at the Convent of St. Elizabeth, where she received her A.B. in 1931. She studied further at Cornell University where she received her Ph.D. in 1938. Her dissertation was A biographical sketch of Christopher Gadsden. During this time she familiarized herself with medicine at the Washington University School of Nursing and at the University of Georgia School of Medicine, where her husband, Fred Mettler, worked. In 1939, she was named assistant professor of medical history at the University of Georgia School of Medicine. In 1941, they moved to New York City, where she held a position as an associate in neurology, Columbia University College of Physicians and Surgeons.

She noted that medical history is typically taught either by delivering chronological lectures or by focusing on a specific topic, and proposed to correlate medical history teaching with the teaching of the medical curriculum. Her major work, The History of Medicine, reflected that approach. It was completed after nine years of work just a few days before her death, and published posthumously.

Mettler died on December 1, 1943, three days after the birth of her daughter.

See also
List of women who died in childbirth

References

Works
 The History of Medicine: A Correlative Text, Arranged According to Subjects.  The Blakiston Co, Philadelphia, 1947
 Mettler CC, Mettler FA. Henry Fraser Campbell. Ann Med Hist. 1939 Sep;1(5):405-426. PMID: 33943399; PMCID: PMC7939583
 Mettler CC. Dugas on the removal of foreign bodies from the eye. Arch Ophthalmol. 1937;18(6):998–999. doi:10.1001/archopht.1937.00850120132013

American medical academics
1909 births
1943 deaths
Historians from New Jersey
Cornell University alumni
Washington University in St. Louis alumni
Washington University School of Medicine alumni
Deaths in childbirth
American women historians
20th-century American historians
20th-century American women writers
Medical historians
People from Weehawken, New Jersey